Jiagou is a town in Panji District, Huainan, Anhui. , it administers the following 15 villages:
Jiagou Village
Wangju Village
Chenji Village
Zhuantang Village
Caiying Village
Liuji Village
Dongwang Village
Gelong Village
Laomiao Village
Huali Village
Miaoqian Village
Linchang Village
Beiwu Village
Xinji Village
Xueji Village

References

Panji District
Township-level divisions of Anhui